Widad Adabi Boufarik, known as WA Boufarik or simply WAB for short, is an Algerian football club based in the town of Boufarik. The club was founded in 1945  and its colours are black and orange. Their home stadium, Mohamed Reggaz Stadium, has a capacity of 8,000 spectators. The club is currently playing in the Algerian Ligue 2.

History
WA Boufarik played 14 seasons in the Algerian Championnat National, the top flight of Algerian football. They also played a number of seasons in the second division.

Despite finishing first in their group in the 2009–10 Inter-Régions Division, the club remained in the third division after the league system was restructured, and are currently playing in the Centre-Ouest group of the Championnat National de Football Amateur.
In 2016 the team returned to the Ligue Professionnelle 2.

On August 5, 2020, WA Boufarik promoted to the Algerian Ligue 2.

Current squad

References

External links

WA Boufarik profile at dzfoot.com
WA Boufarik profile at soccerway.com

 
Football clubs in Algeria
Blida Province
Association football clubs established in 1945
1945 establishments in Algeria
Sports clubs in Algeria